The church of St. Nikolas in Kumanovo, North Macedonia, is a Macedonian Eastern Orthodox church designed by Andrey Damyanov. It is surrounded by  arcades and has a rich interior with  galleries, frescoes and furniture. The construction of the church was finished in 1860 on the same site as a prior church (with the same patron) in the "Varosh maalo".

The church is a tree-aisle monumental basilica-type building, characteristic of the sacred buildings in the Balkans in the 19th century. It is built from stone and bricks. On the northern side there is a porch with colonnades. The central aisle is over-topped with four blind domes. Above the northern, western and southern part of the church extends a gallery where a collection of icons is placed. Above the western part of the gallery extends another one but with smaller dimensions.

There are icons in the church, painted by the Bulgarian painter Kosta Krastev in 1856.

Gallery

References 

Kumanovo
Churches in Kumanovo
Macedonian Orthodox churches